Free electricity to farmers is a subsidised free electricity scheme provided by the Government of Andhra Pradesh.  It is the dream concept of Late Chief Minister Dr. Y.S. Raja Sekhara Reddy.  He is the only leader to provide free electricity to the agriculture sector. Green Andhra Pradesh is his vision. Tamil Nadu giving free electricity to farmers since 1989. It provides 7 hours of power to the fields in a day. It has spent about 6000 crores in 2013.

History
After the congress party made a promise to the electorate, as soon as he swore in as chief minister of Andhra Pradesh, Y.S. Rajasekhara Reddy on 14 May 2004, he signed the scheme.

The scheme announced before the polls was a major promise in the 2004 general elections. The initial subsidy bill was Rs. 400 crores.

References

Government welfare schemes in Andhra Pradesh
Agriculture in Andhra Pradesh
Energy in Andhra Pradesh